Masevaux is a former commune in the Haut-Rhin department in north-eastern France.

Demographic evolution

History
On 1 January 2016, it was merged into the new commune Masevaux-Niederbruck.

Famous Residents
The organist and composer Jacques-Louis Battmann (1818–1886) was born in Masevaux.

See also
 Communes of the Haut-Rhin département

References

Former communes of Haut-Rhin